"Glimmer" is the first Delerium single of their 2015 compilation album Rarities & B-sides featuring vocals by Emily Haines of the band Metric.
Glimmer was recorded at the Chimera recording session in 2003 with Carmen Rizzo and Jamie Muhoberac.

Bill Leeb said about the song: "Glimmer reads a bit like a Hollywood mystery having been lost for years, has resurfaced by happenstance. When our music engineer and mixer, Greg Reely, was pilfering through some recordings, he stumbled upon this song that features Emily Haines of Metric." 

Remixes were done by Emjae and Stereojackers vs Mark Loverush.

Track listing
 Digital Release - 2015
 "Glimmer (Emjae Radio Edit)" - 3:34
 "Glimmer (Stereojackers vs Mark Loverush Radio Edit)" - 3:23
 "Glimmer (Emjae Deep Remix)" - 6:03
 "Glimmer (Emjae Club Remix)" - 5:11
 "Glimmer (Stereojackers vs Mark Loverush Club Mix)" - 7:33
 "Glimmer (Album Version)" - 4:02

References

Delerium songs
2015 songs
2015 singles
Nettwerk Records singles
Songs written by Emily Haines
Songs written by Bill Leeb